Protein DEPP also known as decidual protein induced by progesterone (DEPP) and fasting-induced gene protein (FIG) is a protein that in humans is encoded by the DEPP gene.

Function 

The expression of this gene is induced by fasting as well as by progesterone. The protein encoded by this gene contains a t-synaptosome-associated protein receptor (SNARE) coiled-coil homology domain and a peroxisomal targeting signal. Production of the encoded protein leads to phosphorylation and activation of the transcription factor ELK1.

References

Further reading